The South Australian School of Design was an art school in the earliest days of the City of Adelaide, the progenitor of the South Australian School of Arts, a department of the University of South Australia.

Origin 
In 1856 Charles Hill started a private School of Art in Pulteney Street, where, in that same year, the South Australian Society of Arts was formed.

In 1861 the South Australian School of Design was founded under the management of the Society of Arts and connected with the South Australian Institute, with Charles Hill in charge. In 1862 enrolments were low and decreasing, rising slightly to 21 students in 1863. From the beginning, students were encouraged to show their work at Society exhibitions, and special prizes were offered for members of the School. This led to much mediocre work being shown, but acted as an impetus to native talent. By 1868 there were three classes: girls, boys, and young men, with an average attendance of 25. The school moved into a larger hall at the Institute previously reserved as exhibition space, and the small schoolroom handed over to F. G. Waterhouse, curator of the Museum. A large consignment of busts and statues had been donated by the Royal Society to add to the plaster models already in use for drawing "in the round".

Public Library, Art Gallery and Museum
Charles Hill retired in 1881 and the Board of Governors decided to re-form the School into a School of Design and a School of Painting, and after recruitment for a replacement in England fell through, it was decided to appoint only one master in the first instance, and Eugene von Guerard of Melbourne recommended Louis Tannert, who started in October 1881, as head of the School of Design, later head of the School of Painting. H. P. Gill was appointed in London in 1882 as  head of the School of Design. In 1887 G. A. Reynolds was brought in as first assistant; in 1891 he transferred to the Education Department.

Tannert retired in 1892 and the two schools were reunited as the School of Design and Painting with Gill in charge. The syllabus was broadened with additional subjects, including china painting, under Rosa C. Fiveash. In February 1893 Elizabeth Armstrong (artist) was appointed as Painting Mistress to replace Tannert's teaching duties and she remained at the school until 1929.

A Port Adelaide branch of the School of Design had been formed sometime before October 1893 and Gawler

Sample work from students was sent to the Department of Science and Art, South Kensington for assessment, and students who had reached their standards of proficiency were awarded either the Art Class Teacher's Certificate, or Art Class Master's Certificate.

Early in 1894 the School's title was changed to School of Design, Painting and Technical Art, and the school's ceramic kiln went into operation. The school occupied two floors and incorporated four large classrooms.

Education Department
In mid-1909 responsibility for the management of the School was handed over to the Education Department, and renamed Adelaide School of Art, but with no immediate change of function, courses or staff. Trainee teachers constituted a substantial proportion of its students.

From 1910 to 1916 the school was housed in the Jubilee Exhibition Building, not a popular choice, as the building was not heated in winter.
When during the 'flu epidemic of 1919 that building was turned into a nursing hospital and quarantine station, the school moved to the old Destitute Asylum on Kintore Avenue.
Gill resigned in July 1915 after suffering ill-health for a year or so. He left Australia to return to England but died en route in May 1916.
J. Christie Wright was appointed his replacement, commencing in February 1916, and set about reorganising it as the South Australian School of Arts and Crafts. He enlisted with the First AIF on 13 April 1916, with the assurance of being re-hired on his safe return, and his responsibilities were shared by C. J. Pavia, who handled administrative duties and Geometrical Drawing and Fred C. Britton in charge of all other subjects. Wright was killed in France in 1917. Britton left in 1918 to work as a war artist and  Pavia acted as principal for around three years. L. H. Howie returned from his wartime duties in 1920 and was appointed to the position, retiring in 1941. John Goodchild took over, and was appointed to the post in 1944, but left the following year to act as War Artist for the RAAF. F. Millward Grey was his temporary replacement, made permanent in 1946, serving until 1956. Ken Lamacraft was the next principal, then Douglas Roberts 1957–1958 (in which year the school's title changed yet again, to South Australian School of Art), Paul Beadle followed 1958–1960, then Allan Sierp 1961–1964 then Douglas Roberts again, from 1964.

University of South Australia
The South Australian School of Arts is now a department of the University of South Australia.

References 

Arts in South Australia
Australian vocational education and training providers
Art schools in Australia